Tales of Old Grand-Daddy is the only studio album by Australian rock band Marcus Hook Roll Band, released in Australia in 1973. The album is noted for being the recording debut of future AC/DC founders Angus Young and Malcolm Young.

Overview
Many of the details surrounding Tales of Old Grand Daddy remain forgotten due to excessive alcohol consumption during the recording sessions. According to George Young, "We all got rotten (drunk) – except Angus, who was too young – and we spent a month in the studio boozing it up every night." The album features rhythm and lead guitar from both Malcolm and Angus, although whose parts are whose is a detail long forgotten. It's also not known whether one of them was responsible for the album's slide guitar tracks.

Some of the tracks were later broken up and reused by AC/DC. For example, the track "Quick Reaction" contains a similar riff to the AC/DC song "T.N.T." and elements of the single "Natural Man" was used for "Live Wire".

According to George Young, "It was the first thing Malcolm and Angus did before AC/DC. We didn’t take it very seriously so we thought we’d include them to give them an idea of what recording was all about."

Capitol Records issued the LP in 1978 in America, retitled Marcus Hook Roll Band featuring Harry Vanda and George Young. EMI Australia reissued it in 1983 and Albert Productions re-released it on CD for the first time in 1994. The album was reissued again 20 years later on June 2, 2014, on CD, digital download and vinyl.

Track listing

Charts

Personnel
 George Young – vocals, guitar, piano, bass
 Harry Vanda – lead guitar, vocals
 Alex Young – saxophone
 Angus Young – guitar
 Malcolm Young – guitar
 Freddie Smith – drums
 Ian Campbell – bass
 John Proud – drums
 Howard Casey – saxophone

References

1973 debut albums
albums produced by Harry Vanda
albums produced by George Young (rock musician)
EMI Records albums